A Poor Relation is a 1921 American silent comedy film directed by Clarence G. Badger and written by Bernard McConville. It is based on the play A Poor Relation by Edward E. Kidder. The film stars Will Rogers, Sylvia Breamer, Wallace MacDonald, Sidney Ainsworth, George B. Williams, and Molly Malone. The film was released in December 1921, by Goldwyn Pictures.

Plot
As described in a film magazine, shabby and lovable old inventor Noah Vale (Rogers) shares his attic room with  Rip (DeVilbiss) and Patch (Trebaol), two orphans he has befriended. His lifetime ambition is centered in an invention he has slaved to perfect. In the meantime he tries to keep Rip, Patch, and himself from starving by selling copies of The Decline and Fall of Rome door to door. He is dispossessed and Scallops (Malone), a neighbor's child, gives them shelter. Vale has a distant relative, a wealthy manufacturer by the name of Fay (Williams), and when he writes him for aid in putting the invention to market, Fay's daughter (Breamer) takes a deep interest in the case. Fay's partner Sterrett (Ainsworth) tries to steal a model of the invention, but returns it when he finds that it is worthless. Johnny Smith (MacDonald), secretary to Fay, is discharged but secures work at a newspaper, and gets a position for Vale as a column writer. Vale gives up inventing and when Johnny marries Miss Fay, they provide a home for Rip and Patch.

Cast       
Will Rogers as Noah Vale
Sylvia Breamer as Miss Fay
Wallace MacDonald as Johnny Smith
Sidney Ainsworth as Sterrett
George B. Williams as Mr. Fay
Molly Malone as Scallops
Robert DeVilbiss as Rip
Jeanette Trebaol as Patch
Walter Perry as O'Halley

References

External links

1921 films
1920s English-language films
Silent American comedy films
1921 comedy films
Goldwyn Pictures films
Films directed by Clarence G. Badger
American silent feature films
American black-and-white films
1920s American films